The men's high jump competition at the 1988 Summer Olympics in Seoul, South Korea had an entry list of 27 competitors from 18 nations, with two qualifying groups (27 jumpers) before the final (16) took place on Sunday September 25, 1988. The maximum number of athletes per nation had been set at 3 since the 1930 Olympic Congress. There were two bronze medals awarded. The event was won by Hennadiy Avdyeyenko of the Soviet Union, the nation's first victory in the men's high jump since 1972 and fourth overall. Hollis Conway's silver returned the United States to the podium after a two-Games absence (boycotted in 1980; best place was fourth in 1984) that had disrupted the American streak of medaling in every Olympic men's high jump. Patrik Sjöberg's bronze made Sweden the fourth nation (and Sjöberg the fifth man) to medal in two consecutive Games, after the United States, the Soviet Union, and France. The other bronze medal went to Rudolf Povarnitsyn of the Soviet Union after the countback could not break the tie for third.

Background

This was the 21st appearance of the event, which is one of 12 athletics events to have been held at every Summer Olympics. The returning finalists from the 1984 Games were gold medalist Dietmar Mögenburg of West Germany, silver medalist Patrik Sjöberg of Sweden, bronze medalist Zhu Jianhua of China, sixth-place finisher Milton Ottey of Canada, and tenth-place finisher Carlo Thränhardt of West Germany. For the third straight Games, a boycott affected the high jump favorites; this time, world record holder Javier Sotomayor of Cuba was unable to compete. Without Sotomayor, it was difficult to select a favorite among the strong field which included five former world record holders. All three of the returning medalists had held the record at some point, as had Soviet team members Rudolf Povarnitsyn and Igor Paklin. The third Soviet, Hennadiy Avdyeyenko, had won the world championship in 1983 before missing the 1984 Games due boycott. Sjöberg was the reigning (1987) world champion.

Burkina Faso made its debut in the event. The United States made its 20th appearance, most of any nation, having missed only the boycotted 1980 Games.

Competition format

The competition used the two-round format introduced in 1912. There were two distinct rounds of jumping with results cleared between rounds. Jumpers were eliminated if they had three consecutive failures, whether at a single height or between multiple heights if they attempted to advance before clearing a height.

The qualifying round had the bar set at 2.05 metres, 2.10 metres, 2.15 metres, 2.19 metres, 2.22 metres, 2.25 metres, and 2.28 metres. All jumpers clearing 2.28 metres in the qualifying round advanced to the final. If fewer than 12 jumpers could achieve it, the top 12 (including ties) would advance to the final.

The final had jumps at 2.15 metres, 2.20 metres, 2.25 metres, 2.28 metres, 2.31 metres, 2.34 metres, 2.36 metres, 2.38 metres, and 2.40 metres.

Records

These were the standing world and Olympic records (in metres) prior to the 1988 Summer Olympics.

All four medalists matched the Olympic record at 2.36 metres before Hennadiy Avdyeyenko broke it at 2.38 metres to win the gold.

Schedule

All times are Korea Standard Time adjusted for daylight savings (UTC+10)

Results

Qualifying

Qualification: Qualifying Performance 2.28 (Q) or at least 12 best performers (q) advance to the final.

Final

The competition was marked by "passes and tactical maneuvers."

See also
 1986 Men's European Championships High Jump
 1987 Men's World Championships High Jump
 1990 Men's European Championships High Jump
 1991 Men's World Championships High Jump
 1992 Men's Olympic High Jump

References

External links
  Official Report

 1
High jump at the Olympics
Men's events at the 1988 Summer Olympics